For main Top 5 Division, see: 2009 Asian Five Nations

The 2009 Asian Five Nations division tournaments, known as the 2009 HSBC Asian 5 Nations due to the tournament's sponsorship by the HSBC, refer to the Asian Five Nations divisions played within the tournament. This was the 2nd series of the Asian Five Nations. 

There were three main divisions, with two further regional divisions. The winners of Division 1 would be promoted up to the Top Division for 2010, as will the winner of Division 2 being promoted to Division 1. The loser of Division 1, drops to Division 2. With the newly included Division 3, this also means the winner of Division 3 will replace the loser of Division 2 in 2010.

Scoring system: 5 points for a win, three for a draw, one bonus point for being within seven points of the winning team, and one for four tries.

Changes from 2008
 Singapore are no longer competing in Division 1, following promotion to the Top 5 Division.
 Thailand have replaced China in Division 1, with China competing in Division 2.
 A newly Division 3 is added, with less Regional Divisions taking place.

Teams
The teams involved, with their world rankings pre tournament, were:

Division 1
  (44)
  (50)
  (51)
  (71)

Division 2
  (45)
  (81)
  (78)
  (NA)

Division 3
  (NA)
  (NA)
  (81)
  (NA)

Regional Division 1
  (NA)
  (NA)
  (NA)

Regional Division 2
  (NA)
  (NA)
  (NA)

Division 1

Division One served as the second round of qualifying for the 2011 Rugby World Cup, as the champion, Arabian Gulf, earned promotion to the Asian Five Nations for the 2010 season.  The 2010 HSBC Asian Five Nations will be the final qualifying stage for the Asian representative at the 2011 Rugby World Cup.

Fixtures

Semi finals

Third v Fourth Final

Final

Division 2

Fixtures

Semi finals

Third v Fourth Final

Final

Division 3

Fixtures

Semi finals

Third v Fourth Final

Final

Regional Divisions

Regional 1

Fixtures

Regional 2

Fixtures

Semifinal

Final

References
https://web.archive.org/web/20090407082740/http://www.irb.com/mm/document/newsmedia/0/090302hsbcasianfivenations2009seriesschedule_7322.pdf

2009
2009 in Asian rugby union
Asia